Hamlet is a hamlet located in the Town of Villenova in Chautauqua County, New York, United States. It is at an elevation of 1398 ft (426 m) above sea level.

Hamlet was a historic railroad junction.  The community is in the south part of the town, located on Route 83 at the junction of South Hill and North Hill Roads.  A branch of the Conewango Creek passes north of the community.

References

Hamlets in New York (state)
Hamlets in Chautauqua County, New York